Alex García or Alex Garcia may refer to:

Artists and entertainers
Alex García (producer) (born 1966), Spanish producer
Álex García (actor) (born 1981), Spanish actor
Alex García (chef), Cuban chef

Politicians
Alex P. Garcia (1929–1999), American politician in California

Sportspeople
Alex García (boxer) (born 1961), American heavyweight boxer
Álex García (footballer, born 1970), Spanish footballer
Alex García (racing driver, born 1977), Venezuelan race car driver
Alex Garcia (footballer) (born 1979), Brazilian football player
Alex Garcia (basketball) (born 1980), Brazilian basketball player
Álex García (footballer, born 1984), Spanish footballer
Alex Garcia (fighter) (born 1987), Mixed martial artist
Alex García (racing driver, born 2003), Mexican race car driver

See also
Alejandro García (disambiguation)
Alejo García (disambiguation)